"Gone in the Morning" is a song by English singer-songwriter and musician Newton Faulkner from his debut studio album Hand Built by Robots (2007). The song was released on 19 June 2008 as the album's fifth and final single. The song was written by Toby Faulkner, Newton Faulkner and produced by Andy McKim. The song peaked to number 83 on the UK Singles Chart.

The song is about dreaming and the frustration that occurs when one forgets what they dreamt about.

Track listing
Digital download
 "Gone in the Morning" (Single Version)  - 2:32

Credits and personnel
Lead vocals – Newton Faulkner
Producers – Andy McKim
Lyrics – Toby Faulkner, Newton Faulkner
Label: Ugly Truth

Chart performance

Release history

References

2008 singles
Newton Faulkner songs
Songs written by Newton Faulkner
2007 songs